Immacolata is the Catholic doctrine of the Immaculate Conception.

Immacolata may also refer to:
Immacolata (character), a character in Clive Barker's novel Weaveworld
Church of Immacolata e San Vincenzo 
Immacolata School, a Catholic school in Richmond Heights, Missouri

People with the given name
Immacolata Battaglia (born 1960), Italian politician
Immacolata Sirressi (born 1990), Italian volleyball player

See also
Immaculata (disambiguation)
Immaculate Conception (disambiguation)